Reversing Roe is a 2018 American documentary film directed by Ricki Stern and Anne Sundberg. Through interviews, the film analyzes the abortion laws in the United States and the effects of the 1973 Roe v. Wade case. The film is internationally distributed by Netflix, where it was released on September 13, 2018.

Synopsis
Documentarists Ricki Stern and Anne Sundberg interview several politicians, experts, and activists about the state of the abortion politics in the United States and about the 1973 U.S. Supreme Court's landmark decision Roe v. Wade.

Cast
 Donna Howard as herself
 John Seago as himself
 Brigitte Amiri as herself
 Troy Newman as himself
 Colleen McNicholas as herself
 Linda Greenhouse as herself
 Tom Davis as himself

Release

Reception
Reversing Roe was worldwide released on September 13, 2018, on Netflix. Upon its release, the film received universal acclaim by the critics. On review aggregator Rotten Tomatoes, Reversing Roe has an approval rating of  based on  reviews. Metacritic, which uses a weighted average, assigned a score of 70 out of 100, based on 4 critics, indicating "generally favorable reviews".

Robert Abele of the Los Angeles Times wrote: "As contentiousness turned into real-world consequences, Reversing Roe reminds us that the more women get involved regarding their rights, the more likely we're to see a fair, principled fight". Ben Kenigsberg of The New York Times stated that the film ... "provides a clear and accessible overview of more than 50 years of the social and legal history of the issue in the United States". Brian Lowry, writing for CNN, was more critical towards the film, stating: "While the documentary sheds welcome light on Roe's history -- on the road that brought us to this crucial juncture -- the filmmakers, perhaps inevitably, bypassed some key stops and turns along the way."

Reversing Roe was nominated for an Emmy for Outstanding Politics and Government Documentary at the 40th News and Documentary Emmy Award.

References

External links
 
 

2018 documentary films
American documentary films
Films directed by Ricki Stern and Anne Sundberg
Netflix original documentary films
Documentary films about abortion
2010s English-language films
2010s American films